Michel Dantin (born 15 January 1960, Lyon) is a French politician who served as a Member of the European Parliament for the South-East France constituency from 2009 until 2019. In addition, he has been the mayor of Chambéry from 2014 to 2020. He is a member of the Republicans.

Political career

Career in national politics 
In 1983 at age 23, Dantin became a municipal councillor in Chambéry under Gaullist mayor Pierre Dumas. In 1985, he was elected to the General Council of Savoie for the Rally for the Republic, becoming the youngest councillor. He was Vice President of the General Council under the presidencies of Michel Barnier (1994–98). When seeking a third cantonal term in 1998, he was defeated by Socialist candidate Thierry Repentin. However, he was re-elected as municipal councillor on the RPR or UMP lists in 1989, 1995, 2001 and 2008.

Dantin served in the ministerial cabinets of Hervé Gaymard and Dominique Bussereau between 2002 and 2007, and since 2007 in the cabinet of Michel Barnier.

Member of the European Parliament, 2009–2019 
In the 2009 European elections, Dantin was the sixth candidate on the Union for a Popular Movement list in the South-East region, but he was not elected. However, the fifth UMP MEP, Nora Berra, eventually did not take her seat due to her appointment to the government, which is why Dantin succeeded her. In the 2014 European elections, he was re-elected.

At the time of his first election, Dantin was considered a protégé of Michel Barnier, sometime French agriculture minister, who served as European Commissioner for Internal Market and Services between 2010 and 2014. Throughout his time in parliament, he served on the Committee on Agriculture and Rural Development. From 2010 to 2011, he was also a member of the Special Committee on the policy challenges and budgetary resources for a sustainable European Union after 2013. In addition to his committee assignments, he was a member of the parliament’s delegation with Switzerland and Norway and to the EU-Iceland Joint Parliamentary Committee and the European Economic Area (EEA) Joint Parliamentary Committee from 2014 until 2019.

Within the European People's Party, Dantin served as co-chair of the Ad Hoc Group on Agriculture from 2016 until 2017, alongside Germany’s Minister of Food and Agriculture Christian Schmidt.

In the Republicans’ 2017 leadership election, Dantin endorsed Laurent Wauquiez.

References

 Biography on European Parliament

1960 births
Living people
Politicians from Lyon
MEPs for South-East France 2009–2014
Union for a Popular Movement MEPs
MEPs for South-East France 2014–2019
The Republicans (France) MEPs
Mayors of places in Auvergne-Rhône-Alpes
Politicians from Chambéry